In botany, waterleaf can mean:

 Any plant of the genus Hydrophyllum
 Any plant which is a member of the waterleaf family, Hydrophylloideae
 Talinum fruticosum, a leaf vegetable of the family Talinaceae

In architecture, waterleaf means:

 Waterleaf (architecture), sculptural decoration used on the capitals of columns in late twelfth century Romanesque architecture